Steve Van Wormer (born December 8, 1969) is an American actor.

Early life and career
Van Wormer attended Grand Blanc Community High School and Michigan State University and moved to Los Angeles, California upon graduation. He has acted in movies including Groove, Meet the Deedles, and Jingle All The Way. His television appearances include Without a Trace, Johnny Tsunami and Turks, as well as The Tonight Show. Van Wormer has provided voices for video games, including GRID, Operation Flashpoint: Dragon Rising, Turok, X-Men: The Official Game, and Tony Hawk's American Wasteland. He also provided the voice of the Narrator on The Three Friends and Jerry.

Filmography

Film

Television

Video games

References

External links

Yahoo bio

1969 births
Living people
American people of Dutch descent
American male film actors
American male television actors
American male video game actors
American male voice actors
20th-century American male actors
21st-century American male actors